The Laurel Dash Stakes is a Thoroughbred horse race run annually at Laurel Park Racecourse at Laurel, Maryland. An ungraded stakes open to horses age three and older, it is raced on turf over a distance of five and one-half furlongs.

Historical notes
The inaugural running took place on October 23, 1988 and was won by Daniel Wildenstein's outstanding runner, Steinlen. Once described as "probably the richest and most powerful art dealer on earth", Wildenstein named the horse for the French Art Nouveau painter Théophile Steinlen.

Inclement weather caused track officials to be concerned about the safety of  the turf course in 1997 and 2011 resulting in those races being switched to the dirt track. Ben's Cat won that 2011 event and did it again in 2013. He is the only horse to have won the Laurel Dash twice and it is a noteworthy success in that one was on dirt and the other on grass.

Records
Speed record:
 1:01.71 @ current distance of 5 1/2 furlongs: Dubini (2019)
 1:07.29 @ 6 furlongs: Jazzy Idea (2012)

Most wins:
 2 - Ben's Cat (2011, 2013)

Most wins by a jockey:
 2 - Laffit Pincay Jr. (1988, 1992)
 2 - Edgar Prado (1996, 2016)
 2 - Daniel Centeno (2017, 2019)

Most wins by a trainer:
 2 - King T. Leatherbury (2011, 2013)

Most wins by an owner:
 2 - The Jim Stable (2011, 2013)

Winners

References

Ungraded stakes races in the United States
Horse races in Maryland
Turf races in the United States
Open sprint category horse races
Laurel Park Racecourse
Recurring sporting events established in 1988